Humberstone may refer to:

Place-names
 Humberstone, Leicestershire, now part of the City of Leicester, England
 Humberstone & Hamilton, an electoral ward and administrative division of the City of Leicester, comprising in part the suburb Humberstone
 Humberstone railway station
 Humberstone Road railway station
 Humberstone Speedway, Port Colborne, Ontario, Canada
 Humberstone, Chile, a mining town in the Atacama Desert

Other uses
 Humberstone (surname)
 Humberstone and Santa Laura Saltpeter Works, World Heritage sites in northern Chile
 Matthew Humberstone School (1882–2010), Cleethorpes, Lincolnshire, England

See also
 Humberston, a village near Cleethorpes, Lincolnshire, England
 Humberston Wright, (fl. 1918–1947), British film actor